Richard Coeur de Lion: An historical romance is a 1786 semi-opera with an English text by John Burgoyne set to music by Thomas Linley the Elder. It was first staged at Drury Lane Theatre in October 1786. It was a translation of Michel-Jean Sedaine's opera Richard Coeur-de-lion about the life of the English Monarch Richard I with the ending significantly changed. The work was a major success and ran for 43 performances and was revived seven times before the end of the century. By contrast a rival version staged at the Covent Garden Theatre at the same time was a failure.

References

Bibliography
 Fenner, Theodore. Opera in London: Views of the Press, 1785-1830. Southern Illinois University Press, 1994.
 Thomson, Peter. The Cambridge Introduction to English Theatre, 1660-1900. Cambridge University Press, 2006.
 Nicoll, Allardyce. A History of English Drama 1660-1900. Volume III: Late Eighteenth Century Drama. Cambridge University Press, 1952.

External links
Text in the National Library of Australia, accessed 11 February 2011

Plays by John Burgoyne
1786 plays
Cultural depictions of Richard I of England
Compositions by Thomas Linley the elder
Plays about English royalty